Stanislav Igorevich Kharitonov (born 12 April 1980) is a former Russian professional football player.

Club career
He played 3 seasons in the Russian Football National League for FC Amur Blagoveshchensk and FC Metallurg-Kuzbass Novokuznetsk.

References

1980 births
Living people
Russian footballers
Association football midfielders
FC Novokuznetsk players
FC Amur Blagoveshchensk players